Karl-Heinz Peters (28 August 1903 – 5 September 1990) was a German film actor.

Selected filmography

 Alarm at Station III (1939)
 Men Are That Way (1939)
 The Governor (1939)
 Enemies (1940)
 Mein Leben für Irland (1940)
 Between Hamburg and Haiti (1940)
 The Three Codonas (1940)
 The Fire Devil (1940)
 Commissioner Eyck (1940)
 Bismarck (1940)
 Much Ado About Nixi (1942)
 Diesel (1942)
 Derby (1949)
 The Prisoner (1949)
 Amico (1949)
 The Girl from the South Seas (1950)
 Only One Night (1950)
 Scandal at the Embassy (1950)
 Harbour Melody (1950)
 Crown Jewels (1950)
 We're Dancing on the Rainbow (1952)
 Cuba Cabana (1952)
 Monks, Girls and Hungarian Soldiers (1952)
 Jonny Saves Nebrador (1953)
 Elephant Fury (1953)
 The Poacher (1953)
 The Missing Miniature (1954)
 The Angel with the Flaming Sword (1954)
 Conchita and the Engineer (1954)
 Island of the Dead (1955)
 All Roads Lead Home (1957)
 Emilia Galotti (1958)
 The Muzzle (1958)
 Tatort Berlin (1958)
 A Woman Who Knows What She Wants (1958)
 The Crimson Circle (1960)
 The Green Archer (1961)
 Hurra, die Schule brennt! (1969)
 Our Doctor is the Best (1969)
 Birdie (1971)
 Ludwig (1972)

References

External links
 

1903 births
1990 deaths
German male film actors
20th-century German male actors